Parklands is a 1996 Australian drama film written and directed by Kathryn Millard. The 51-minute-long movie includes Chamber of Commerce-style promotional material about Adelaide that was made in the 1950s and '60s.

Plot summary
Rosie returns home to attend the funeral of her father Cliff, who left her mother years earlier. His mistress Jean invites Rosie to stay with her for a while, allowing her time to learn about what her father was doing throughout the years they were separated. Her investigation into his past leads to diaries he kept, and entries he made suggest that despite his career as a policeman he was a corrupt man involved in the drug trade.

Principal cast
Cate Blanchett ..... Rosie
Tony Martin ..... Cliff
Carmel Johnson ..... Jean
Tony Mack ..... Dave Morrison
Patrick Duggin ..... Andrew
Bridget Walters ..... Mrs. Roberts
Jo Peoples ..... Elizabeth

Principal production credits
Producer ..... Helen Bowden
Original Music ..... Richard Vella
Cinematography ..... Mandy Walker
Production Design ..... Prisque Salvi

Awards and nominations
The Australian Cinematographers Society honored Mandy Walker with their Award of Distinction for Fictional Drama Shorts, and Kathryn Millard won the Certificate of Merit for Film & Video – Short Narrative III (31–60 minutes) at the San Francisco International Film Festival.

See also
Cinema of Australia

External links
 Parklands at the Internet Movie Database

1996 films
Australian drama films
Films shot in Adelaide
Films set in South Australia
1996 drama films
1990s English-language films
1990s Australian films